This is a list of color film processes known to have been created for photographing and exhibiting motion pictures in color since the first attempts were made in the late 1890s. It is limited to "natural color" processes, meaning processes in which the color is photographically recorded and reproduced rather than artificially added by hand-painting, stencil coloring, or other arbitrary "colorization" methods.

Legend

Process: the name of the process, as advertised by the company if commercialized. Known alternative names and second-party commercial aliases are also shown.
Year: The earliest known year of existence based on patents, reports of demonstrations, etc. The first public showing or commercial use (if any) may be later.
Projection method: a classification into one of four process types, plus a notation of how many primary colors were used:Additive: multiple black-and-white images photographed through color filters are projected through corresponding filters and united on the screen. The component images may either be projected simultaneously or in rapid succession.Subtractive: the color image is physically present as transparent coloring matter in the film. No special projection equipment is required.Mosaic (additive): the film incorporates a mosaic of extremely small color filters, allowing a color image to be photographed as one black-and-white image consisting of many microscopically small color-filtered fragments. The same mosaic reconstitutes the color when the film is projected, so no special equipment is needed.Lenticular (additive): a black-and-white film which has been embossed on its base side with hundreds or thousands of tiny lenses is used for the original photography, base side forward and in conjunction with a segmented multicolored filter on the camera lens. As in mosaic processes, the result is an array of adjacent microscopic black-and-white image fragments that record the color information. Projection must reverse the optical geometry used for photography, so it requires not only a similar segmented filter but also highly compatible and correctly adjusted projection optics.
Inventor: the known inventor(s) of the process.
Introductory film: the first known public showing of the process.

List

References

External links 

 Timeline of Historical Film Colors, a comprehensive database of color film systems including bibliographies, filmographies, many photographs of historical films, patents, and links etc.

Film and video technology
Articles containing video clips